Pessac Centre tram stop is the terminus of the Pessac Centre branch of line B of the Bordeaux tramway, and is located on Avenue Eugène et Marc Dulout in the centre of the commune of Pessac. The tram stop is adjacent to Pessac railway station, with direct access between station and tram stop platforms, and the Mairie de Pessac.

The stop was inaugurated 29 May 2007, when line B was extended from Bougnard. It remained the sole terminus at the southern end of line B until April 2015, when a second branch was opened from Bougnard to France Alouette. The stop is operated by Transports Bordeaux Métropole.

For most of the day on Mondays to Fridays, trams run at least every ten minutes between Pessac Centre and Bordeaux city centre. Services run less frequently in the early morning, late evenings, weekends and public holidays.

Intechanges

SNCF
Trains calling at Pessac railway station

Buses of the TBC

References

External links 
 

Bordeaux tramway stops
Tram stops in Pessac
Railway stations in France opened in 2007